Lake Bonneville was the largest Late Pleistocene paleolake in the Great Basin of western North America. It was a pluvial lake that formed in response to an increase in precipitation and a decrease in evaporation as a result of cooler temperatures. The lake covered much of what is now western Utah and at its highest level extended into present-day Idaho and Nevada. Many other hydrographically closed basins in the Great Basin contained expanded lakes during the Late Pleistocene, including Lake Lahontan in northwestern Nevada.

Geologic description

Shorelines of Lake Bonneville are visible above Salt Lake City along the western front of the Wasatch Mountains and on other mountains throughout the Bonneville basin. These shorelines appear as shelves or benches that protrude from the mountainside above the valley floor, are visible on the ground from long distances and on satellite images, and have both depositional and erosional segments along their lengths. Three shorelines of Lake Bonneville that can be traced throughout the basin, have been given names: Stansbury, Bonneville, and Provo. The Stansbury and Bonneville shorelines formed during the transgressive phase of Lake Bonneville; the Provo shoreline formed during the overflowing phase. Numerous other unnamed shorelines, which cannot be mapped everywhere in the basin, some of which formed during the transgressive phase and some during the regressive phase, are also present on piedmont slopes and alluvial fans. Great Salt Lake, Utah Lake, and Sevier Lake are the largest post-Bonneville lakes in the Bonneville basin.

Causes of lake expansion and contraction 
Lake Bonneville was not a "proglacial” lake, although it did form between about 30,000 and 13,000 years ago when glaciers at many places on Earth were expanded relative to today during the last major glaciation. For most of its existence (that is, during the transgressive plus regressive phases) Lake Bonneville had no river outlet and occupied a hydrographically closed basin. Changes in lake level were the result of changes in water balance caused by climate change (a simplified version of the water-balance equation is inputs equal outputs plus-or-minus storage changes). Storage changes are equal to volume changes, and changes in volume are correlated with changes in lake level. When inputs (e.g., precipitation; runoff in rivers) were greater than outputs (e.g., evaporation from the lake surface; evapotranspiration in the basin), lake level rose, and when outputs were greater than inputs, lake level fell. Changes in global atmospheric circulation led to changes in the water budget of Lake Bonneville and other lakes in the Great Basin of western North America. Mountain glaciers in the Bonneville drainage basin stored less than 5% of the water that Lake Bonneville held at its maximum, so that even if all the mountain glaciers in the basin melted at once and the water flowed into the lake (this didn't happen—it took thousands of years for the mountain glaciers to melt, and Lake Bonneville was falling by that time), it would have had little effect on lake level. Lake Bonneville had no river connection with the huge North American ice sheets. While Lake Bonneville existed the patterns of wave- and current-forming winds were not significantly affected by the Laurentide and Cordilleran ice sheets in northern North America.

The name “Bonneville” 
Lake Bonneville was named by the geologist G.K. Gilbert after Benjamin Louis Eulalie de Bonneville (1796–1878), a French-born officer in the United States Army who was also a fur trapper and explorer in the American West. Bonneville's adventures were popularized by Washington Irving in the 1800s, but Captain Bonneville probably never saw Great Salt Lake or the Great Basin. G.K. Gilbert was one of the greatest geologists of the 19th Century, and his monumental work on Lake Bonneville, published in 1890, set the stage for scientific research on the paleolake that continues today. Although a general description and understanding of Lake Bonneville has been established by the work of many people, details of the paleolake, including its history and connections to global environmental systems, will be pursued for many years to come.

Geologic history 
Lake Bonneville began to rise from elevations similar to those of modern Great Salt Lake about 30,000 years ago. During its transgressive phase in the closed basin (an endorheic basin), lake level oscillated because of changes in climate but the lake gradually rose until about 18,000 years ago when it reached its highest elevation, marked by the Bonneville shoreline. At that level the lake had risen to the lowest point on its basin rim and had begun to overflow into the Snake River drainage near Red Rock Pass in what is now southeastern Idaho. The overflow, which would have begun as a trickle across the dam formed by the Marsh Creek alluvial fan, quickly evolved into a tremendous flood, the Bonneville flood, which charged down the Marsh Creek valley to the Portneuf River, into the Snake River and then into the Columbia River and Pacific Ocean. Groundwater sapping on the north slope of the Marsh Creek alluvial fan, which began long before the lake had reached its highest level, added to the instability and ultimate collapse of the fan-dam. 

River flow from the lake across the Red Rock Pass threshold and out of the lake basin continued non-catastrophically for about 3000 years after the flood ended; the Provo shoreline formed during this overflowing phase. The Provo shoreline is distinguished from other shorelines of Lake Bonneville by its topographic position, strong development, and thick accumulations of tufa. At the end of the overflowing phase, about 15,000 years ago, climate change and a shift to a negative water balance (more water evaporated off the surface of the lake than entered by rivers or direct precipitation) caused the lake to return to its closed-basin status as it declined to lower levels during the regressive phase. By 13,000 years ago the lake had fallen to an elevation similar to the average elevation of modern Great Salt Lake. Although Lake Bonneville and the Great Salt Lake are collectively one lake system, the name “Lake Bonneville” is applied to the lake during the period from 30,000 to 13,000 years ago, and the name “Great Salt Lake” since 13,000 years ago.

Lake Bonneville was anomalous in the long-term history of the basin. As the largest of four deep lakes in the basin during the past 800,000 years, Lake Bonneville plus the other three deep Pleistocene lakes, persisted for less than 10% of the time. The conditions experienced in the basin today are typical of over 90% of the past 800,000 years: a dry desert basin with a few scattered low-elevation lakes, the largest of which (Great Salt Lake) was hypersaline. For most of the time between the end of the youngest of the deep pre-Bonneville lakes (the Little Valley lake cycle, about 150,000 years ago) and the initial rise of Lake Bonneville about 30,000 years ago, the lake would have resembled modern Great Salt Lake in surface area and depth. A short episode of slightly higher lake levels during the Cutler Dam lake cycle occurred about 60,000 years ago; at this time a moderate-sized lake rose above the level of Great Salt Lake, but not as high as Lake Bonneville.

In his monograph on Lake Bonneville, G.K. Gilbert called the offshore deposits of Lake Bonneville the “White Marl.” Although the name “White Marl” has not been used by the geologic community in a formal sense, the informal term “white marl” (or “Bonneville marl”) is frequently employed. The Bonneville marl at locations far from sources of clastic sediment (gravel, sand, and silt), such as river deltas or active wave zones, is dominated by clay-sized particles of calcium carbonate that precipitated chemically from the lake water. Most of this calcium carbonate is in the form of the mineral calcite, but aragonite is common in Bonneville marl in the Sevier basin and in the lower part of the Bonneville marl stratigraphic section in the main body. Aragonite is the dominant carbonate mineral in sediments of post-Bonneville Great Salt Lake. Dropstones, probably mostly derived from shore ice, but possibly also from floating root balls, are common in the marl, and consist of granule- to boulder-sized clasts.

The Bonneville flood had catastrophic effects along the Snake River in what is now Idaho, but the influence of the flood can also be detected within the lake basin where a distinctive layer of sediment was deposited. The Bonneville flood bed can be identified in many surface exposures below the Provo shoreline and in sediment cores. The flood bed is characterized by an abrupt contact at its base between massive marl, which was deposited in the deepest water of Lake Bonneville, and finely laminated or ripple-laminated sandy marl, which was deposited by bottom currents during the flood. In places the Bonneville flood bed is composed of reworked ostracode shells. The contact at the top of the flood bed is transitional to massive marl that was deposited in the lake floor during Provo time. The flood bed is best developed and most obvious in straits between partially submerged mountain ranges or in places where bottom currents were strong as lake water flowed toward its outlet at Red Rock Pass. Because the Bonneville flood bed was deposited in less than a year, it is useful as a well-dated (~18,000 years ago) stratigraphic marker within the Bonneville deposits.

Previous publications, regarded the “Gilbert shoreline” as one of the prominent shorelines in the Bonneville basin, but this interpretation has been revised. The “Gilbert shoreline” consists of a line on a map that connects lacustrine shoreline features, such as barrier beaches, but there is no evidence that all the barriers formed at the same time. It is now clear that some of those barrier beaches are transgressive-phase Bonneville in age and some are regressive-phase Bonneville in age. The Gilbert episode was a rise of Great Salt Lake about  higher than modern average levels, which culminated 11,600 years ago. But a mappable shoreline of the Gilbert episode has not been recognized.

Isostasy
The shorelines of Lake Bonneville have been warped by isostatic processes, as was recognized by Gilbert and extensively studied since Gilbert's day. Earth's crust subsided beneath the weight of the water while the lake existed, but when the lake evaporated and the water load was considerably reduced, the crust beneath the lake basin rebounded. As a result, the elevation of the Bonneville shoreline is  higher in the Lakeside Mountains, elevation , west of the Great Salt Lake near the center of the Lake Bonneville water load, than at Red Rock Pass, where the lake was very shallow.

Fossils, volcanic ashes, etc. 
In addition to the abundant geological features produced by Lake Bonneville, such as shorelines and sediments, fossilized fish bones and scales reveal information about the physical and chemical characteristics of the paleolake. Pollen from plants that lived in the Bonneville basin is abundant in Bonneville marl. Invertebrate fossils in Lake Bonneville deposits include mollusks and ostracodes, and bones of extinct mammals are found in Pleistocene deposits in the Bonneville basin. Volcanic ashes in sediments of Lake Bonneville help with correlations and aid in deciphering lake history. Lake Bonneville shorelines, and those of other paleolakes on Earth, are good analogs for shorelines on other planets, such as Mars.

See also
 List of prehistoric lakes
 Lake Lahontan
 Bonneville cutthroat trout: endemic to area formerly covered by Lake Bonneville
 Bonneville Salt Flats
 Western Interior Seaway

References

External links

 Brigham Young University - Geology - maps of Lake Bonneville
 Utah Geologic Survey- maps of Lake Bonneville, and additional information on Lake Bonneville and Great Salt Lake

Bonneville
Glacial lakes of the United States
Bonneville
Bonneville
Bonneville
Bonneville
Bonneville
Snake River
Megafloods
Natural history of Utah
Natural history of Idaho
Natural history of Nevada
Pleistocene United States
Quaternary Idaho
Quaternary Nevada
Quaternary Utah